Occupatio (occupation) was an original method of acquiring ownership of un-owned property (res nullius) by occupying with intent to own.

Roman legal writings on acquisition by occupatio 
Nicholas argues this is the "archetype" of all other Roman law methods of original acquisition.  According to the Roman jurist Gaius, any previously unowned thing becomes the just property of the first occupant able to "capture" it:

Abandoned goods (res derelictae) was also res nullius and subject to acquirement through occupatio. Land, however, was excluded and could not be acquired using occupatio.

Occupatio in the modern world 
The Roman law occupatio has continued relevance in present times, partly due to its adoption by legal systems across Europe, Africa and North America. It is also used in international law.

Domestic legal systems 
Legal systems across the modern world continue to employ a form of occupatio. A full discussion of each legal system is outwith the discussion of this article but see: South African property law, civilian property law, Scots Law, Occupatio (Scots law).

International law 
International law adopts much of Roman property law in regards to acquisition of sovereignty due to the European nature of early European discovery voyages such as Christopher Columbus. Occupatio was later employed under public international law as the basis of acquisition of states ownership of vacant territory (often including land already possessed by indigenous populations). An example of occupatio under international law is the United Kingdom's acquisition of ownership of Rockall in the North Atlantic Ocean by the Island of Rockall Act 1972.

See also 
Adverse possession
Usucapio
Homestead principle
Squatting
Terra nullius
Acquisition of Sovereignty

References 

Roman law
International law
Sovereignty
Aboriginal title